Events from the year 1975 in Scotland.

Incumbents 

 Secretary of State for Scotland and Keeper of the Great Seal – Willie Ross

Law officers 
 Lord Advocate – Ronald King Murray
 Solicitor General for Scotland – John McCluskey

Judiciary 
 Lord President of the Court of Session and Lord Justice General – Lord Emslie
 Lord Justice Clerk – Lord Wheatley
 Chairman of the Scottish Land Court – Lord Birsay

Events 
 January – Dounreay Prototype Fast Reactor begins to feed electric power to the National Grid.
 22 January – Radio Forth begins broadcasting to the Edinburgh area.
 5 May – the Scottish Daily News begins publication in Glasgow. It is Britain's first worker-controlled, mass-circulation daily, formed as a workers' cooperative by 500 staff made redundant when the Scottish Daily Express closed its printing operations in Scotland and moved to Manchester.
 16 May – local government in Scotland reorganised under terms of the Local Government (Scotland) Act 1973: counties, large burghs and small burghs and existing districts are completely abolished and replaced by a uniform two-tier system of regional and district councils (except in the islands, which have unitary authorities). The districts of Aberdeen, Edinburgh, Dundee and Glasgow are accorded city status in the United Kingdom; Elgin and Perth lose this status (although Perth regains it later). County, burgh and amalgamated constabularies are merged into eight regional police forces.
 11 June – the first North Sea oil is pumped ashore at the Sullom Voe Terminal in Shetland.
 24 September – Currie-born climber Dougal Haston and Englishman Doug Scott become the first British people to reach the summit of Mount Everest, via the previously unclimbed south-west face.
 3 November – a petroleum pipeline from Cruden Bay to Grangemouth Refinery is formally opened by the Queen.
 8 November – the Scottish Daily News ceases publication.
 24 December – 'Great Mull Air Mystery': Peter Gibbs vanishes after taking off from Glenforsa Airfield on a solo night flight; his body is found 4 months later on a hillside.
 December
 Ballachulish Bridge is opened in the West Highlands, replacing a ferry.
 First production from the Auk oilfield in the North Sea.
 date unknown
 Reintroduction of the white-tailed eagle to the Isle of Rùm begins.
 John Watson's Institution in Edinburgh closes (founded 1762)

Births 
 18 May – John Higgins, snooker player
 23 June – KT Tunstall, born Kate V. Tunstall, rock singer-songwriter
 7 July – Richard Arkless, politician
 9 October – Joe McFadden, actor
 12 November – Katherine Grainger, rower
 15 December – Ayesha Hazarika, comedian and political commentator
 Zoë Strachan, novelist

Deaths 
 15 January – Sydney Goodsir Smith, Lallans poet (born 1915 in New Zealand)
 2 March – Helen Cruickshank, poet, suffragette and nationalist (born 1886)
 5 March – George Friel, novelist (born 1910)
 13 March – Jeannie Robertson, folk singer (born 1908)
 28 March – Abe Moffat, miner, trade unionist and communist activist (born 1896)
 3 April – Mary Ure, actress (born 1933)
 8 June – Douglas Guthrie, otolaryngologist and medical historian (born 1885)
 21 June – Sir Robert Matthew, modernist architect (born 1906)
 20 July – Fionn MacColla, novelist (born 1906)

The arts 
 John Quigley's historical novel King's Royal is published.

See also 
 1975 in Northern Ireland

References 

 
Scotland
Years of the 20th century in Scotland
1970s in Scotland